The 1979 World Challenge Cup was the first snooker tournament to have a team format of six nations with three players per team. The event was held between 20 and 27 October 1979 at the Haden Hill Leisure Centre in Birmingham, England.

Cliff Thorburn made the highest break of the tournament, 126.
 


Main draw

Teams

Group A

Group B

Final

References

World Cup (snooker)
1979 in snooker